Brockway Township is a civil township of St. Clair County in the U.S. state of Michigan.  As of the 2010 Census, the township population was 2,022.

History
Brockway Township was established in 1848.

Community
Brockway is an unincorporated community in the southeastern part of the Township where M-19 and M-136 intersect near the border with Emmett Township.
Canova is an unincorporated community in established as a lumber town in 1866.  It had a post office from 1876 until 1883.

Geography

Demographics
As of the census of 2000, there were 1,900 people, 637 households, and 540 families residing in the township. There were 669 housing units at an average density of 19.7 per square mile (7.6/km2). The racial makeup of the township was 96.89% White, 0.37% African American, 0.32% Native American, 0.32% Asian, 1.16% from other races, and 0.95% from two or more races. Hispanic or Latino of any race were 2.05% of the population.

There were 637 households, out of which 39.6% had children under the age of 18 living with them, 73.2% were married couples living together, 7.8% had a female householder with no husband present, and 15.1% were non-families. 12.4% of all households were made up of individuals, and 5.2% had someone living alone who was 65 years of age or older.  The average household size was 2.97 and the average family size was 3.22.

In the township the population was spread out, with 28.7% under the age of 18, 8.0% from 18 to 24, 29.9% from 25 to 44, 24.4% from 45 to 64, and 9.0% who were 65 years of age or older.  The median age was 35 years. For every 100 females, there were 100.2 males.  For every 100 females age 18 and over, there were 95.5 males.

The median income for a household in the township was $52,361, and the median income for a family was $55,592. Males had a median income of $41,286 versus $30,000 for females. The per capita income for the township was $19,268. About 6.0% of families and 8.0% of the population were below the poverty line, including 12.5% of those under age 18 and 7.0% of those age 65 or over.

Notable people 

 Zelda Sears, actress, screenwriter, novelist and businesswoman; born near Brockway (1873—1935)

References

Notes

Sources

Townships in St. Clair County, Michigan
1848 establishments in Michigan
Townships in Michigan
Populated places established in 1848